John Opel House, also known as the Green Tree Hotel and Bochelman House, is a historic home located at Jasper, Dubois County, Indiana.  It was built about 1850, and is a -story, five bay by three bay, Federal style brick dwelling.  It rests on a stone foundation, has a gable roof, and interior end chimneys.  It features a saw-tooth cornice and barrel-vaulted wine cellar.

It was added to the National Register of Historic Places in 1984.

References

Houses on the National Register of Historic Places in Indiana
Federal architecture in Indiana
Houses completed in 1850
Jasper, Indiana
Houses in Dubois County, Indiana
National Register of Historic Places in Dubois County, Indiana